Júlia Hajdú (8 September 1925 – 23 October 1987) was a Hungarian composer and pianist. She was born into a Jewish family in Budapest, and died in the same city.

Works
Hajdú was the composer of 14 operettas and/or musicals. Selected works include:
 Csak a szépre emlékezem (I Only Remember the Good Times)

Her works have been recorded and issued on CD, including:
Evergreen Melodies (April 22, 2003) Hungaroton, ASIN: B00008ZL87

References

1925 births
1987 deaths
20th-century classical composers
Hungarian classical composers
Hungarian Jews
Hungarian music educators
Jewish classical composers
Women classical composers
Women music educators
20th-century women composers